The episodes of the Japanese animated television series , part of the Yu Yu Hakusho media franchise are directed by Noriyuki Abe and produced by Fuji Television, Yomiko Advertising and Studio Pierrot. They are based on the YuYu Hakusho manga series by Yoshihiro Togashi, incorporating nineteen volumes of the source material over one hundred and twelve episodes. The series concentrates on the adventures of Yusuke Urameshi, who after his death becomes a Spirit Detective, the protector of the Living World against supernatural threats.

The series aired weekly from October 10, 1992, to December 17, 1994, on Fuji Television in Japan.

Episode list
A note on the "season" nomenclature: 
The seasons that comprise the following list correspond to the box sets released in North America by Funimation. However, these "seasons" only correspond to story arcs, and not to the pattern in which the show actually aired in either Japan or the United States. In Japan, Yu Yu Hakusho was aired year-round continuously, with regular pre-emptions for sporting events and television specials taking place, not split into standard seasonal cycles. In the United States, the show did indeed have four seasons, but those contained different episodes than on the DVDs. Season One contained episodes 1~21, Season Two contained 22~53, Season Three contained 54~89, and Season Four contained 90~112.

Season 1: Spirit Detective Saga (1992–93)

Season 2: Dark Tournament Saga (1993–94)

Season 3: Chapter Black Saga (1994)

Season 4: Three Kings Saga (1994)

References
General

Specific

External links
YuYu Hakusho at Studio Pierrot's website